Susan Margaret Pavish (née Jowett; born 14 September 1956) is a former New Zealand sprinter.

Jowett won the 1976 New Zealand 100 and 200m titles. She then went on to compete in the women's 100 metres at the 1976 Summer Olympics.

References

External links
 

1956 births
Living people
Athletes (track and field) at the 1976 Summer Olympics
New Zealand female sprinters
Olympic athletes of New Zealand
Athletes from Dunedin
Olympic female sprinters